Harry Thornber (9 November 1851 – 28 July 1913) was an English cricketer.  Born at Manchester, Lancashire, he was a right-handed batsman who made one appearance in first-class cricket.

Thornber played his club cricket for Manchester and Sale, before making his appearance in first-class cricket for Lancashire in 1874 against Kent at Maidstone. He opened the batting alongside Dick Barlow in Lancashire's first-innings, but was dismissed for a duck by James Fellowes, while in their second-innings he batted lower in the order, but was again dismissed for a duck, this time run out. He was described as a steady middle order batsman with a sound defence.

Outside of playing cricket, Thornber was a merchant, trading with the East Indies. He died at St Pancras, London on 28 July 1913.

References

External links
Harry Thornber at ESPNcricinfo
Harry Thornber at CricketArchive

1851 births
1913 deaths
Cricketers from Manchester
English cricketers
Lancashire cricketers
English merchants
19th-century English businesspeople